Juan Max Boettner (May 26, 1899 – July 3, 1958), was a Paraguayan medical doctor and musical composer.

Early life
Boettner was the son of Alfred Boettner (German) and María Victoria Gautier (French).  While young he was sent to Germany to study in primary and secondary school. He studied medicine at the University of Jena, Hamburg and later in Buenos Aires, where he graduated in 1926.

Medicine

He started to practice medicine as a professor of Infectious Diseases in the Faculty of Medicine in the Muñiz Hospital in Buenos Aires.

In 1929 he moved to Asunción, with the intention of dedicating fully to his specially, “tuberculosis”, at the time that disease was a great problem, it affected a big part of the population, plus there were just a few drugs that could serve to treat it and the use of X-rays was still very restricted.

The campaign against the tuberculosis had a great impulse with him in charge. In a beginning he was Director of the Tuberculosis Clinic. Later he was Director of the “Fight against Tuberculosis”, which with time became a department in the Public Health Ministry.

He was professor of the Faculty of Medicine of Asunción, teaching about Tuberculosis, until 1941.

Short time after arriving in Paraguay, Doctor Boettner published several valuable studies about medicine. In 1930 he published his work about “Evolution of Tuberculosis”, “Study of the Vertebral Spine”, “Congenital Malformations of the Respiratory System”, “Respiratory Pathology”, “Manual about Tuberculosis” in 1939, “Silicosis in Paraguay”, “Greek and Latin Etymology for Medical uses” in 1945.

In 1945 he inaugurated the “Sanatorio Bella Vista” (Hospital Bella Vista), built by his own impulse and destined to the medical attention of people with pulmonary diseases. In this institution many renowned specialist in thorax surgery were educated. Today it is an important hospital located in the Venezuela Street, in Asunción and it’s named “Hospital Juan Max Boettner”.

He was founder and the first president of the Paraguayan Circle of Medical Doctors.

When the Chaco War started he presented himself and offered his services to the country. He was appointed 2nd Lieutenant and he took charge of the X-Ray Department in the Military Hospital of Asunción. He was also sent to Isla Poí, where he was promoted. Later he also served in the 2nd Body of the Army in Fortín Camacho, nowadays called Mariscal Estigarribia. In 1935 he became captain of the Health Department.

Justo Pastor Benítez, in 1947, recalls the names of Juan Max and Ricardo Boettner, both Medical Doctors as scientists of a new generation that stood out among others because of their work and the dedication to educate.

Music

His name acquired even more importance when his first musical arrangements were known. As a great piano player and composer he left many samples of his delicate interpretation of folkloric and also classical music. His musical work was rich in motivation. Among others, he composed in 1957 “Himno Nacional”, “Danzas Tradicionales del Paraguay” and “Música y músicos del Paraguay” and one didactic play called “Cómo reconocer el estilo y el autor de una obra musical”; “Fantasía esclava”, “Sinfonía en Mi Menor”, “El alma del inca”, “Yrendague”, “Sinfonía Paraguaya” and “Canciones folklóricas paraguayas”.

He was married with Gilda Vierci.

Legacy

There is a street named after him in the neighborhood of Manorá, in Asunción. The street is parallel to the Aviadores del Chaco Avenue, it goes (north-east to south) from Felipe Molas Avenue to Papa Juan XXIII Street.

References 

 “El solar guaraní”. Justo Pastor Benítez
 “Forjadores del Paraguay”. Omar Quiroga
 “Asunción y sus calles”. Osvaldo Kallsen

External links 
 Biografía de J. M. Boettner
 Música Paraguaya

1899 births
1958 deaths
Paraguayan composers
Male composers
Paraguayan pulmonologists
Paraguayan people of German descent
Paraguayan people of French descent
University of Jena alumni
People from Asunción
People of the Chaco War
20th-century composers
20th-century male musicians